Peter Bredl (born 20 April 1951) is an Austrian rower. He competed in the men's eight event at the 1972 Summer Olympics.

References

1951 births
Living people
Austrian male rowers
Olympic rowers of Austria
Rowers at the 1972 Summer Olympics
Place of birth missing (living people)